Swartwout is a Dutch surname, a variant of Swarthout (literally, black skin). Notable people with it include:
Cornelius Swartwout (1839–1910), American inventor 
Egerton Swartwout (1870–1943), American architect
Tracy and Swartwout, an architectural firm in New York City 
Frederick Swartwout Cozzens (1818–1869), American humorist
Jacobus Swartwout (1734–1827), American landowner, statesman and military leader
Robert Swartwout (1779–1848), American military officer, merchant and alderman 
Robert Egerton Swartwout (1905–1951), American-born author, poet and cartoonist
Roeloff Swartwout (1634–1715), Dutch settler in America
Samuel Swartwout (1783–1856), American soldier, merchant and politician
Swartwout–Hoyt scandal, a political scandal in 1829
Thomas Samuel Swartwout (1660–1723), American settler 
Tomys Swartwout (1607–1660), Dutch merchant, ancestor of Robert Swartwout

References

Dutch-language surnames